María Alejandra Vento-Kabchi (born 24 May 1974) is a former female tennis player from Venezuela. In July 2004, she reached her career-high singles ranking of world No. 26. She won four WTA titles in doubles.

Vento-Kabchi reached the fourth round of the US Open in 2005, where she was heavily defeated by the eventual champion, Kim Clijsters. Vento-Kabchi likened the defeat to being "run over by a truck".

Her best results in Grand Slam tournaments are reaching the fourth round in Wimbledon (1997) and US Open (2005).

She competed as María Vento until July 21, 2001, when she married lawyer Gamal Kabchi.

Vento-Kabchi retired from professional tennis in 2006.

WTA career finals

Singles (1 runner-up)

ITF finals

Singles (7–6)

Doubles (2–2)

References

External links
 
 
 

1974 births
Living people
Tennis players from Caracas
Venezuelan female tennis players
Tennis players at the 1999 Pan American Games
Tennis players at the 2000 Summer Olympics
Olympic tennis players of Venezuela
Pan American Games gold medalists for Venezuela
Pan American Games medalists in tennis
Central American and Caribbean Games medalists in tennis
Central American and Caribbean Games gold medalists for Venezuela
Medalists at the 1999 Pan American Games
20th-century Venezuelan women
21st-century Venezuelan women